Syrian General Intelligence Directorate (GID) Branch 251, also known as internal branch or Al-Khatib branch, is the unit of the Syrian General Intelligence Directorate concerned with internal security. It has been responsible for security in the Damascus region. Branch 251 operates Al-Khatib prison, a detention and torture center located in the Muhajreen neighborhood in central Damascus. 

Anwar Raslan, the former Syrian colonel who was convicted of crimes against humanity and sentenced to life in prison in Germany, commanded a unit in Branch 251.

United States Department of Treasury Sanctions 
The Independent International Commission of Inquiry on Syria identified Branch 251 and Al-Khatib prison as a facility controlled by the Syrian General Intelligence Directorate where death in detention and torture have occurred. Branch 251 was designated pursuant to Executive Order 13572 (E.O. 13572), which blocks property of certain properties with respect to Human Rights Abuses in Syria, as being owned or controlled by the Syrian General Intelligence Directorate. The head of Branch 251, Ahmed Al-Dib, was designated pursuant to E.O. 13572 for being a senior official of the Syrian GID and subject to US Treasury sanctions.

List of heads 

 Mohammed Nasif Kheirbek (?–1999)
 Bahjat Suleiman (1999–June 2005)
 Fouad Nasif Kheir Bek (June 2005–?)
 Tawfiq Younes (2011-2016), the European Union sanctioned him for "being involved in violence against the civilian population during the Syrian uprisings".
 Ahmed Al-Dib (?  - Present), Sanctioned by the United States Treasury for leading Syrian General Intelligence Directorate Branch 251, has been implicated in reports of arbitrary detention and torture of detainees since at least 2011.

References 

Syrian intelligence agencies